Brintons is a British manufacturer of carpets, founded in 1783 by William Brinton, at Hill Pool in Chaddesley, Kidderminster, to manufacture spun yarns.

Its first factory in Kidderminster was established in 1820 and as of 2008 the company still had a major manufacturing presence on the Stourport edge of the town. In 1970 Brintons opened their first factory in Telford, Shropshire, to make spun yarns.  It owns and operates other factories all over the world including Poland, Portugal and India manufacturing bespoke and stock woven Axminster and Wilton wool-rich carpets and rugs.

In 1993, Brintons launched an advertising campaign featuring costumes made from the company's carpets designed by Vivienne Westwood. A second Westwood designed campaign followed in 1995, based on dress styles from 1783, the year the company was founded.  The photography for both campaigns was by David Bailey.  A third campaign was launched in 1996 and in 2000, British designer Antony Price created evening gowns constructed from carpet and photographed by Patrick Lichfield (Lord Lichfield) for these advertisements.

As one of the first companies to be awarded the Royal Warrant at the beginning of Queen Elizabeth II's reign in 1958, Brintons has continued to supply carpets and designs for a range of projects for the Queen, Buckingham Palace and other Royal households.

The firm faced financial difficulties in 2011, its 228th year, and was acquired by The Carlyle Group in September of that year.

In August 2015, Brintons acquired F.D Agnella, a Polish manufacturer and supplier of carpets and rugs.
 
Brintons has one of the world's largest commercial design archives and historical pattern libraries in the industry, which dates back to the late 18th century. It contains thousands of original hand-painted design papers from Baroque and Art Deco to up-to-the minute contemporary designs.
 
Brintons was acquired from Carlyle Group by Argand Partners in 2017 for an undisclosed sum.

References

External links
 
 Alfombras Website

Textile manufacturers of England
Carpet manufacturing companies
Manufacturing companies established in 1820
Companies based in Worcestershire
British companies established in 1820
1820 establishments in England